Jalance is a municipality in the comarca of Valle de Cofrentes in the Valencian Community, Spain.

References

Municipalities in the Province of Valencia
Valle de Cofrentes